The 1980–81 UCLA Bruins men's basketball team represented the University of California, Los Angeles in the 1980–81 NCAA Division I men's basketball season.  Larry Brown was the head coach, and the Bruins started the season ranked 6th in the nation (AP Poll). The Bruins started the season 6-0 and was ranked a season high #3 (AP Poll). They then lost at #1 ranked Depaul, 93–77, on December 27. UCLA's team finished 3rd in the Pac-10 regular season. UCLA participated the NCAA Tournament but was upset by BYU in the first round, finishing 10th in the AP poll. Larry Brown coached his second and final year at UCLA.

Starting lineup

Roster

Schedule

|-
!colspan=9 style=|Regular Season

|-
!colspan=12 style="background:#;"| NCAA Tournament

Source

Notes
Larry Brown was only at UCLA two years, but made the NCAA Tournament both times. He was 5–2 in NCAA Tournament games while at UCLA.

References

UCLA Bruins men's basketball seasons
Ucla
UCLA
UCLA
Ucla